Elisabeth Dermot Walsh (born 15 September 1974) is an English actress, known for her role as Zara Carmichael in the BBC soap opera Doctors. In 2015, she won Best Female Acting Performance at the RTS Midlands Awards for her portrayal of Zara.

Early life
Born in Merton, Walsh is the daughter of Irish actor Dermot Walsh and English actress Elisabeth Madeleine Annear. She has a sister, Olivia, and, from her father's previous marriages, a half-sister, Sally, and a half-brother, Michael. Walsh was educated at West Heath School in Sevenoaks, Kent. She then studied at the Royal Academy of Dramatic Art in London. Before pursuing a career in acting, Walsh worked as an intern for an American Senator in Washington DC when she was 17.

Career
Walsh made her television debut in the 1998 television film Falling for a Dancer. She has also made appearances in television series such as Love in a Cold Climate, Unfinished Business, Midsomer Murders, Love Soup and Holby City. She also played the lead role of Elinor Carlisle in the 2003 ITV adaptation of Agatha Christie's Sad Cypress.

In June 2009, she joined the regular cast of the BBC drama Doctors, in the role of Zara Carmichael. In an interview with OK! Magazine, Walsh talked about her character, saying: "I think it would be fair to call Zara a bit of a handful! She's quite the volatile personality, and I grabbed the character with both hands. She’s been a bit of a home-wrecker in the past, but I like her; even when you’re playing a baddie, you have to play a baddie like you’re playing a heroine. She behaves appallingly. I don’t think I’d particularly want her as a friend, but she’d be a great fun ride if you’re with Zara!". For her portrayal of Zara, Walsh won the award for Best Female Acting Performance at the 2015 RTS Midlands Awards. Walsh has expressed interest in writing episodes of Doctors, and since 2014, she has directed nine episodes.

Filmography

Stage

Awards and nominations

References

External links
 

1974 births
Alumni of RADA
Actresses from London
English television actresses
English film actresses
English stage actresses
English soap opera actresses
English people of Irish descent
Living people